KGGI (99.1 MHz) is a commercial FM radio station licensed to Riverside, California, and broadcasting to the Inland Empire. The station airs a Rhythmic Contemporary radio format and is owned by iHeartMedia, Inc.   Its studios are on Iowa Avenue in Riverside.

KGGI has an effective radiated power (ERP) of 2,550 watts.  Its transmitter tower is on Ongo Camp Road in San Bernardino National Forest near Lake Arrowhead and Running Springs.  KGGI broadcasts an HD Radio signal.  The HD2 digital subchannel formerly played Classic Hip Hop music but has since been turned off.  The station also streams on the iHeartRadio app.

History

Christian Radio and Contemporary Hits
It aired a Christian radio format as KBBL ("K-Bible"). The original chief engineer, who signed KGGI on the air, was Lee McGowan. Upon its sale from C. Edwin Goad to Lyncoln and Sylvia Dellar in 1979, KBBL became KGGI. The original airstaff for KGGI included program director Brian White, along with Bob West, Lisa Giles, Dan Harrison, Cliff Roberts, and Benny Martinez, while Jerry Clifton was the consultant. When the acquisition closed, KGGI flipped to Top 40 (CHR).

In 1998, the station was sold to Chase Radio Properties. It was sold again in 2000 to AMFM, Inc. AMFM was an affiliate of Clear Channel Outdoor, which in turn spun off its communications and radio divisions into Clear Channel Communications.  In 2014, Clear Channel Communications was renamed iHeartMedia.  Over time, the station moved from Mainstream Top 40 to a Rhythmic Contemporary format.

Street Team
The KGGI Street Team are the promotions employees who go out on the streets of Inland Empire and promotes the radio station and its advertising partners to the city, specifically targeting the urban, Latina (specifically female) and ages 18–29 markets. The KGGI Street Team consists of two street tag team members. They also assist at live broadcasts featuring DJs and mixers.

References

External links
Local Radio: First place battle between KGGI and KOLA January 10, 2011
Official Website

GGI
Rhythmic contemporary radio stations in the United States
Mass media in Riverside, California
Mass media in San Bernardino, California
Mass media in Riverside County, California
Mass media in San Bernardino County, California
Radio stations established in 1965
1965 establishments in California
IHeartMedia radio stations